The Pit sculpin (Cottus pitensis) is a species of freshwater ray-finned fish belonging to the family Cottidae, the typical sculpins. It is found in the United States, inhabiting the Pit and upper Sacramento River systems in Oregon and California. It reaches a maximum length of 13.0 cm. It prefers rubble and gravel riffles.

References

Cottus (fish)
Fish described in 1963
Taxa named by Reeve Maclaren Bailey